Phenacovolva barbieri is a species of sea snail, a marine gastropod mollusc in the family Ovulidae, the ovulids, cowry allies or false cowries.

Description
The length of the shell attains 31.9 mm.

Distribution
This marine species occurs off the Philippines.

References

 Lorenz F. & Fehse D. (2009) The living Ovulidae. A manual of the families of allied cowries: Ovulidae, Pediculariidae and Eocypraeidae. Hackenheim: Conchbooks.

Ovulidae
Gastropods described in 2009